Gargela arcualis is a moth in the Crambidae family. It was described by George Hampson in 1906. It is found on New Guinea.

References

Crambinae
Moths described in 1906
Moths of New Guinea